Uberella vitrea is a species of sea snail, a marine gastropod mollusc in the family Naticidae, the moon snails.

References

 Powell A. W. B., New Zealand Mollusca, William Collins Publishers Ltd, Auckland, New Zealand 1979 

Naticidae
Gastropods of New Zealand
Gastropods described in 1873